Trimeresurus malcolmi is a venomous pitviper species found in East Malaysia. Common names include: Malcolm's pitviper, Malcolm's tree viper, and Mt. Kinabalu pit viper.

Etymology
The specific name, malcolmi, is in honor of British herpetologist Malcolm Arthur Smith.

Description
Scalation includes 19 rows of dorsal scales at midbody, 163-174 ventral scales, 64-81/61-64 subcaudal scales in males/females, and 8-9 supralabial scales.

Common names
Malcolm's pitviper, Malcolm's tree viper, Mt. Kinabalu pit viper, Malcolm's pit viper.

Geographic range
Found in East Malaysia at 1,000-1,600 m elevation (3,280-5,250 feet). The type locality given is "Sungii River, near Bundutuan, Mount Kinabalu, British North Borneo [Sabah], at an altitude circa 3,000 feet [914 m]".

References

Further reading
Loveridge, A. 1938. New Snakes of the Genera Calamaria, Bungarus and Trimeresurus from Mount Kinabalu, North Borneo. Proc. Biol. Soc. Washington 51: 43–45. ("Trimeresurus sumatranus malcolmi, subsp. nov.", p. 45.)

External links
 

malcolmi
Endemic fauna of Borneo
Fauna of the Borneo montane rain forests
Endemic fauna of Malaysia
Reptiles of Malaysia